National Park Mountain is in Yellowstone National Park in the U.S. state of Wyoming. National Park Mountain rises above the confluence of the Firehole River and the Madison River and is just west of Madison Junction.

References

Mountains of Yellowstone National Park
Mountains of Wyoming
Mountains of Teton County, Wyoming